Nelson Courtlandt Brown (born 1885) was an American forester.

Early life
Brown was born on March 1, 1985, in South Orange, New Jersey. He graduated from Yale University with a bachelors of Arts degree in 1906 and a Master of Forestry degree in 1908.

Early career

He was with the U.S. Forest Service working mainly in the northwest and the south (1908–1912). Brown was appointed Assistant Professor of Forest Utilization at the New York State College of Forestry, Syracuse, New York, on July 1, 1912, and appointed to Professor in 1914. He first taught the fundamental forestry subjects and later became head of the Department of Forest Utilization.

Wartime service

Brown resigned on August 31, 1917, to take up duties as the US Federal Trade Commissioner in Europe. In 1918, he was transferred to the American Expeditionary Force as adviser in forest products and utilization.

Return to New York

Brown was reappointed Professor of Forest Utilization at the New York State College of Forestry on August 1, 1921. When F. Franklin Moon became Dean, Brown served in Moon's administration. When Moon was on sabbatical leave from 1926–1927, Brown served as Acting Dean. Upon Moon's death, Brown again was appointed Acting Dean. Brown served as Acting Dean three times in his career: 1926-1927; 1928; and 1929-1930.

In his first administration, Brown secured the gift of the Charles Lathrop Pack Demonstration Forest and a cash donation for the forest's preliminary development. In his second administration, he secured the state appropriation for the campus's second building, what became Louis Marshall Memorial Hall (Marshall Hall), which offered greater teaching and laboratory space. Brown also procured the only substantial increases in state appropriations for teaching staff salaries as well as a grant of $10,000 for forest investigations.

Scientific contributions

Brown co-authored Elements of Forestry with F. Franklin Moon. Other texts included Forest Products and Their Manufacture (1919), America's Lumber Industry (1923), Logging - Principles and Practice (1934), General Forestry (1935), and Logging Transportation (1936). Brown also authored articles on the economic and practical phases of lumber production, manufacture, and consumption for technical and trade journals.

References

External links 
The Archives from Nelson Brown's tenure as Acting Dean of the New York State College of Forestry are located in the Archives of the SUNY College of Environmental Sciences and Forestry http://www.esf.edu/moonlib/archives/

Yale School of Forestry & Environmental Studies alumni
History of forestry education
Year of death missing
State University of New York College of Environmental Science and Forestry faculty
Leaders of the State University of New York College of Environmental Science and Forestry
New York State College of Forestry
1885 births